The Sam Ray House is a historic house in rural northern White County, Arkansas.  It is located northeast of Clay, on the east side of Arkansas Highway 305 just south of Sunrise Drive.  It is a single story wood frame double-pile structure, topped by a hip roof that extends over the porch on two sides.  Built about 1915, it is an extremely rare example of a French Creole style of architecture within the county.

The house was listed on the National Register of Historic Places in 1992.

See also
National Register of Historic Places listings in White County, Arkansas

References

Houses on the National Register of Historic Places in Arkansas
Houses completed in 1915
Houses in White County, Arkansas
National Register of Historic Places in White County, Arkansas
1915 establishments in Arkansas
Creole architecture in the United States